Rococo Á Go Go (released as Swingling Telemann in France) is the fifth album released by the Swingle Singers.  The album was nominated for a 1966 Grammy award.

All tracks from this album are also included on the 11 disk Philips boxed set, Swingle Singers.

Track listing
Tracks 1 - 5 from Concerto for flute, violin & strings in E minor ("Concerto à Sei"), TWV 52:e3 (Telemann)
"Allegro" – 2:27
"Adagio" – 1:25
"Presto" – 1:08
"Adagio" – 0:34
"Allegro" – 2:08
"21e ordre for harpsichord (Pièces de clavecin, IV) (Couperin) – 2:51
"Overture: La Lyra, suite for strings & continuo in E flat major, TWV 55 (Telemann) – 1:43
"Work(s) ~ Unspecified Fugue in D minor (Muffat) – 3:03
"Trio for flute, violin & continuo in E major" (Essercizii Musici No. 9/1) (Telemann) – 1:27
"Concerto for oboe d'amore, strings & continuo in A major," TWV 51:A2 ~ Lar (Telemann) – 3:09
"Le Coucou, rondeau for harpsichord in E minor" (Pièces de clavecin, Suite N (Daquin) – 1:42
"Sonata for recorder & continuo in E minor," SF. 764 (Op. 2/4 or in D min) (Marcello) – 1:54
"Work(s) ~ Sonata in C minor: Allegro" (Quantz) – 1:49
"Work(s) ~ Sonata in C minor: Andante Moderato" (Quantz) – 2:59
"Work(s) ~ Sonata in C minor: Vivace" (Quantz) – 1:57

Personnel
Vocals:
Jeanette Baucomont – soprano
Christiane Legrand – soprano
Alice Herald – alto
Claudine Meunier – alto
Ward Swingle – tenor, arranger
Claude Germain – tenor
Jean Cussac – baritone
José Germain – bass
Rhythm section:
Guy Pedersen – double bass
Daniel Humair – drums

References / external links
Philips PHM 200-214 (Mono LP) / Philips PHS 600-214 (Stereo LP)
Swingling Telemann at [ allmusic.com]

The Swingle Singers albums
1966 albums
French-language albums
Philips Records albums